Dwain Lingenfelter (born February 27, 1949) is a businessman, farmer, politician and former Leader of the Saskatchewan New Democratic Party. Lingenfelter won the leadership of the Saskatchewan New Democratic Party on June 6, 2009. He resigned as leader on November 7, 2011. Previously, he had also served as the president of the party. 

In  the-governments of Premier Blakeney and Romanow, Lingenfelter served as Minister of Social Services, Minister of Economic Development, Minister responsible for Crown Investments Corporation, Minister of Agriculture and as the Deputy Premier. Outside politics Lingenfelter is the President and CEO of CypressView Land and Cattle Corp, board member of the Canada World Petroleum Council, board member of the Canadian Wildlife Federation Trust, past president of the Canada Arab Business Council, former Vice-President of Government Relation of Nexen Inc, former Chairman of the Mount Royal University Foundation  and a former board member of the Nature Conservancy of Canada.

Family and education
Lingenfelter grew up on a family farm which he currently operates near Shaunavon, Saskatchewan. He grew up in a large family, with a German father and an Irish Catholic mother and eight other siblings. He attended Shaunavon High School and earned a political science degree from the University of Saskatchewan. While working on his political science degree, Lingenfelter continued to farm and work as a customs officer.

He is married to Rubiela Lingenfelter and has five children between two marriages, Sacha, Matthew, Travis, Link and Hannah.

Politics
Lingenfelter was first elected to the Legislature in the constituency of Shaunavon in 1978, then re-elected in 1982 but then defeated in 1986. During his first term, he was appointed by Allan Blakeney to serve in Cabinet as Minister of Social Services.

Lingenfelter was one of nine New Democratic Party members elected to the Legislative Assembly of Saskatchewan, after the landslide win of the Progressive Conservative Party of Saskatchewan. From 1982 to 1986, Lingenfelter served as the Opposition House Leader; during this time he earned the moniker "one man NDP rat pack."

After being defeated in the 1986 Saskatchewan provincial election, Lingenfelter ran and won the race to be President of the Saskatchewan New Democratic Party in June 1987.

On May 4, 1988 Lingenfelter won a by-election in the constituency of Regina Elphinstone, previously held by Blakeney, and received 77.33% of the popular vote. He was re-elected in the 1991 provincial election. He was then appointed by Premier Roy Romanow to Cabinet as the Minister Responsible for Economic Development and Chair of the board of four Saskatchewan Crown Corporations, as well as the Government House Leader.

With a crisis in the agriculture sector, Romanow appointed Lingenfelter as Minister of Agriculture and Food, and again as Government House Leader.

As deputy premier, Lingenfelter was viewed as a likely candidate to succeed Romanow as leader of the Saskatchewan New Democratic Party, but in July 2000 he announced that he was leaving provincial politics and seeking opportunities in the private sector. He became vice-president of International Government Relations for Calgary-based energy company Canadian Occidental Petroleum on September 1, 2000. Canadian Occidental Petroleum became Nexen Energy Inc.

2009 Saskatchewan NDP leadership race
On October 30, 2008, Lingenfelter was the first candidate to announce his candidacy to replace Lorne Calvert as the Leader of the Saskatchewan New Democrats at the June 6, 2009 leadership convention. Lingenfelter was the first declared candidate with former party president Yens Pedersen entering second, MLA Deb Higgins entering third and doctor Ryan Meili entering fourth. Lingenfelter received the endorsement of over half of the party's caucus as well as a number of unions including the largest private sector union in Saskatchewan, the UFCW Local 1400 and the United Steelworkers.

2009 Regina Douglas Park by-election
Lingenfelter was later nominated as the NDP candidate for the by-election in Regina Douglas Park.

On September 21, Douglas Park voters elected Lingenfelter, giving him 50.25% of the total votes counted in a three-way race matching him against the Saskatchewan Party candidate, Kathleen Peterson, and the Green Party's Victor Becker Lau.

2011 SK General election

Lingenfelter led the NDP into the 2011 provincial election. In the November 7 election, the Saskatchewan NDP was defeated, losing 11 seats. The NDP ended up winning nine of fifty-eight seats, its worst showing since 1982. It also tallied its lowest popular vote percentage since 1938. One of the losing NDP MLA's was Lingenfelter, who lost his seat to the Saskatchewan Party's Russ Marchuk by a 10-point margin. With the Saskatchewan Party landslide beyond doubt, Lingenfelter resigned as NDP leader on election night.

References

1949 births
Living people
Saskatchewan New Democratic Party MLAs
People from Shaunavon, Saskatchewan
Leaders of the Saskatchewan CCF/NDP
Canadian people of German descent
Canadian people of Irish descent
21st-century Canadian politicians
Members of the Executive Council of Saskatchewan